Bacolor, officially the Municipality of Bacolor, is a 3rd class municipality in the province of Pampanga, Philippines. According to the 2020 census, it has a population of 48,066 people.

Bacolor is the birthplace of Father Anselmo Jorge de Fajardo, considered the "Father of Kapampangan literature" for writing the 1831 Kapampangan "kumidya" Don Gonzalo de Cordova.

History
Don Guillermo Manabat, a rich landlord, is believed to be the founder of Bacolor in 1574. Historical records show that Bacolor has been in existence as a proposed settlement as early as 1571, the same year Manila was founded by the Spanish. When the Spaniards arrived in Bacolor they found Bakúlud; its original name meant "level ground" because the site was formerly part of the Luzon coastline until eruptions from Mount Pinatubo raised it above the ocean floor.

The first settlers of Bacolor were believed to be Malays that came from Atjeh in Sumatra led by Panday Pira. It is believed to have been founded by Monmon, first cousin and sister-in-law of Malangsic, a son of Prince Balagtas. However, historians recorded the official foundation of Bacolor in 1574 through a landlord named Guillermo Manabat, whose palatial house and resting place is now the site of the San Guillermo Church, hence the church's name. The name Bakúlud was changed to Bacólor with the advent of the Spanish.

Bacolor officially became the capital of Pampanga in 1755. According to Spanish chronicler Fray Gaspar de San Agustin, before 1755, Mexico town “es la corte de Pampanga,” while Bacolor “es la capital” and Guagua “es igualmente.” Historian Dr. Luciano Santiago theorizes that
before Bacolor was formally recognized as provincial capital, it was already informally functioning as capital although other provincial administrative offices were elsewhere in Mexico and Guagua.

During the British occupation of Manila, when Manila fell to the British, it became capital of the exiled government of Governor General Simón de Anda y Salazar from October 6, 1762, to May 30, 1764. The provincial offices were temporarily moved to Factoría (now San Isidro, Nueva Ecija). Through a decree of the King of Spain on November 9, 1765, Bacolor became Villa de Bacólor, one of the only three villas in the Philippines and was granted a special coat of arms. Simón de Anda organized an army of natives for the defense of Bacolor and with the aim of recapturing Manila.

It remained the capital of Pampanga until the provincial seat of government was transferred to neighboring San Fernando in 1904. Moves to transfer the provincial capital to San Fernando actually began as early as 1852 with an expediente from the alcalde mayor. The King of Spain granted the request in a real cedula dated September 11, 1881. Despite royal approval, the transfer was not executed until August 15, 1904,  by virtue of Act No. 1204.

The coming of the American colonizers broke up the military form of government and instead political and economic reforms were introduced. A civil form of government was organized and was inaugurated on February 13, 1901, by Com. William H. Taft which took place in the old Escuela de Artes y Oficios de Bacólor, later known as the Pampanga School of Arts and Trade and now the Don Honorio Ventura State University, the first state university in Pampanga.

The first provincial Civil Governor was Don Ceferino Joven and the first Municipal President of Bacolor was Don Estanislao Santos. Pampanga was acknowledged as the first province to have organized civil government in the Philippines by General Grant, the then President of the United States of America.

When the Second World War broke out, Japanese fighter and bomber planes invaded the municipal town in Bacolor in December 1941 until the town was occupied by the Imperial Japanese forces in 1942. Pampangan guerrillas and Hukbalahap Communist groups joined in an insurgency centered around the municipality of Bacolor, supported by local soldiers and military officers of the Philippine Commonwealth Army. Their attacks against the Japanese occupation continued until 1945, when Filipino and American forces liberated the municipality of Bacolor. 

In 1956, the sitio of Mesalipit was converted into a barrio.

The lahar flows from the mountains raised the town to its current level of an approximate 37 meters above sea level. Subsidence caused the constant reclaiming of parts of Pampanga by the sea.

Geography

Barangays
Bacolor is politically subdivided into 21 barangays.

Climate

Demographics

Economy

Government

Like other towns in the Philippines, Bacolor is governed by a mayor and vice mayor who are elected to three-year terms. The mayor is the executive head and leads the town's departments in executing the ordinances and improving public services. The vice mayor heads a legislative council (Sangguniang Bayan) consisting of councilors from the barangays or barrios.

Town hall
The municipal building is the former site of the Venturas house, one of Bacolor's most prominent families. On July 8, 1953, the new town hall was completed during the tenure of Mayor Manuel de Jesus. Its construction was a project of Senator Pablo Ángeles y David, a native of Bacolor.

Tourism

The main landmark of the town is the San Guillermo Parish Church known as the 'sunken church', one of the structures that was half-buried by the lava flow from the eruption of Mount Pinatubo in 1991. The church has since been renovated and is currently operational and may be accessed through what were once the second floor windows, now converted into doorways. The sunken church and town of Bacolor were used to shoot the 2009–2010 ABS-CBN primetime television series May Bukas Pa. The municipality also made an appearance in various films such as the 1996 movie Istokwa, 2006 movie Summer Heat and 2008 movie Jay, and in the music video of the song Promise Me by J Brothers. The Shrine of Our Lady of Lourdes in Cabetican is also famous for its annual pilgrimage and barrio fiestas.

Other notable landmarks in Bacolor include Memorial Kilometer Posts of the Bataan Death March along the MacArthur Highway; the oldest trade school in Far East, the Don Honorio Ventura Technological State University; the Simón de Anda y Salazar monument at the town hall; monument to the Kapampangan writer and revolutionary leader Juan Crisostomo Soto (1867-1918); and Monument to Felix Galura Y Napao.

Bacolor's festivals are the Feast of San Guillermo and Nuestra Senora del Santissimo Rosario (La Naval) which are celebrated every 10th day of February and 3rd Sunday of November, respectively.

The Sunken Shrine

Buried by the devastating lahar flows of Mount Pinatubo eruption in June 1991, the Archdiocesan Shrine of Our Lady of Lourdes of Cabetican (abbreviated as "Maluca") remains at the center of Marian Concordia Pilgrimages and Healing in Pampanga. Originally built as an annexe to the older, smaller shrine, it is under the care of Fr. Ronnie Cao, Healing Priest and Rector of the Archdiocesan Shrine.

Notable personalities
Father Anselmo Jorge de Fajardo, the "Father of Pampangan Literature"
Mamerto Natividad, Filipino military leader
Pablo Ángeles y David, was a Filipino magistrate and statesman. During his career, he became a judge, a member of the Philippine House of Representatives, Governor of Pampanga and a member of the Senate of the Philippines.
Francisco Tongio Liongson, former Senator of the Philippines
Francisco Alonso Liongson, the son of Francisco Tongio Liongson
Pedro Tongio Liongson, Filipino lawyer and member of the Malolos Congress
Juan Crisostomo Soto, was a Filipino poet, dramatist, journalist and newspaperman. He was also known the "Father of Pampango Literature."
Práxedes Fajardo, Filipina revolutionary
Felix Galura, was a participant in the Philippine Revolution and a famous writer in Pampanga. He is known the "Father of Kapampangan Grammar."
Honorio Ventura, former Governor of Pampanga
Jayson Castro, is a Filipino professional basketball player currently playing in the Philippine Basketball Association.
Zoilo Galang, Filipino writer from Pampanga

References

External links

Bacolor Profile at PhilAtlas.com
[ Philippine Standard Geographic Code]
Philippine Census Information
Local Governance Performance Management System

Municipalities of Pampanga
Former national capitals
Former provincial capitals of the Philippines